The Tekakwitha Conference is a Roman Catholic institution that supports Christian ministry among Native Americans, primarily through its annual meeting.

History
The Tekakwitha Conference began in 1939, when Bishop Aloisius Joseph Muench of the Roman Catholic Diocese of Fargo convened 27 missionaries and three Native American laymen to discuss their pastoral concerns about Northern Plains native communities, in what became an annual event.  In 1940, its participants named the meeting, the Tekakwitha Conference, in honor of Kateri Tekakwitha. At the annual meetings, priests, religious brothers and guest speakers involved in region discussed concerns ranging from reservation life and Catholic schools, in the 1940s and 1950s, to urban relocation, native customs in Catholic worship, native deacons, and native self-determination, in the 1960s and 1970s. Prior to 1977, it is believed that attendance at annual meetings remained less than 100 persons.

From 1977 to 1979, the Conference reorganized after becoming moribund and making failed attempts to update itself. With financial support and an invitation from the Bureau of Catholic Indian Missions it invited a substantial number of Native American Catholics and their supporters to attend, which included priests, deacons, religious sisters and laity. In 1978, attendance at the annual meeting exceeded 200 participants for the first time. The Conference welcomed them, it then established a board of directors and it incorporated in 1979.

Since then, attendance at meetings and membership has continued to grow. By the 1990s, membership included native people from throughout the United States and Canada with more than 100 native parishes establishing local chapters called Kateri circles. Through member involvement, the scope of meetings expanded to include Catholic mass with Native American rituals and symbols, such as smudging and songs and prayers in native languages, ongoing reports on the canonization cause of Kateri Tekakwitha and numerous workshops and discussion sessions on pastoral concerns.

In 1980, the Tekakwitha Conference established offices in Great Falls, Montana and initiated a newsletter, now titled Cross and Feathers. Sister Kateri Mitchell, a member of Mohawk Nation and the Sisters of St. Anne, has served as executive director since 1998. Bishop Donald E. Pellotte of Gallup served as its Episcopal moderator from 1981 to 2008 and Archbishop Charles J. Chaput of Philadelphia succeeded him in 2008. In 2013, the Tekakwitha Conference offices moved to Alexandria, Louisiana.

(With the canonization process of Kateri Tekakwitha having reached fruition after many decades, and indeed the several centuries since the Saint's death, both Sr. Kateri Mitchell and the subject of the key second first class miracle attributed to Tekawitha in the 2006 healing of Lummi tribal member, Jake Finkbonner, were participants in Rome on October 21, 2012 in the actual canonization ceremony, and since then the impact, scope, and cultural reach of the conference has begun to grow as might be expected through the recognition of the Roman Catholic Church's, and North America's, first Native American saint. (St. Juan Diego preceded her in 2002 as the first indigenous Roman Catholic Saint from the Americas, but it is also worth noting, historically, that his birth had predated hers by almost two centuries.)

Since these recent events, Saint Kateri Tekawitha now lends her name and venerable history to the Conference through her newly found stature as one and only among officially recognized and authenticated North American indigenous saints.

See also
Marquette University Special Collections and University Archives

References
Tekakwitha Conference Records at Marquette University.
Bureau of Catholic Indian Missions Digital Collection; ID number 10171 (participants of 1964 Tekakwitha Conference)
 
Tekakwitha Conference History

External links
Tekakwitha Conference Home Page

History of Catholicism in the United States
Christian organizations established in 1939
Catholic organizations established in the 20th century
1939 establishments in North Dakota
Native American organizations